Amazone zu Pferde is an 1841 bronze equestrian statue by August Kiss, installed outside the Altes Museum in Berlin, Germany. It was based on a smaller clay model which August Kiss first built in 1839. Amazone zu Pferde stands opposite its companion statue, Löwenkämpfer.

A bronze copy, cast in 1929, sits in front of the Philadelphia Museum of Art. Zinc copies also exist in England, Italy, and elsewhere in Germany.

See also

 1841 in art

References

External links
 

1841 sculptures
Amazons in art
Bronze sculptures in Germany
Equestrian statues in Germany
Outdoor sculptures in Berlin
Sculptures of women in Germany
Statues in Germany
Museum Island